Kapil Moreshwar Patil (born March 5, 1961) is politician from Bhiwandi in Maharashtra, India. He became the Union Minister of State in the Ministry of Panchayati Raj during Prime Minister Narendra Modi's ministry reshuffle on July 7, 2021. He belong to Koli community of Maharashtra.

Education
Patil completed his graduation in B.A. in year 1984-85 from Mumbai University.

Political career
Patil contested 2014 Lok Sabha elections from Bhiwandi (Lok Sabha constituency) as BJP /NDA candidate.

He was sworn-in as a union minister in Prime Minister Narendra Modi's ministry reshuffle on July 7, 2021. He is the Minister of State in the Ministry of Panchayati Raj.

Positions held
He was Chairman of Thane District Co-operative Bank. He also worked as President of Thane Zilla Parishad. He moved from Nationalist Congress Party to Bharatiya Janata Party in March 2014.

May, 2014 : Elected to 16th Lok Sabha
1 Sep. 2014 onwards : Member, Standing Committee on Urban Development.

References

People from Thane district
Koli people
1961 births
Marathi politicians
Bharatiya Janata Party politicians from Maharashtra
India MPs 2014–2019
Living people
Lok Sabha members from Maharashtra
Maharashtra district councillors
Politics of Thane district
People from Bhiwandi
India MPs 2019–present
Narendra Modi ministry